The bidding for the 2010 Youth Olympics Games began in August 2007, to which nine cities presented their candidature files. In the competition to host the inaugural Youth Olympic Games in 2010, the list was shortened to five in November 2007.  The list was further shortened to two in January 2008—Moscow and Singapore.

Moscow was the highest rated city in the evaluation report, but may have been disadvantaged due to the win by Russian city Sochi to host the 2014 Winter Olympics. Singapore also had a very high evaluation and had a possible geographical advantage, being situated in a region (Southeast Asia) which had never hosted.

Singapore was announced as the host city on 21 February 2008 after a tally of a postal vote.

Process

Cities interested in hosting the games had to have their applications confirmed by their respective National Olympic Committees and submitted to the International Olympic Committee (IOC) by August 31, 2007. On September 3, nine cities were confirmed as official applicants by the Committee. They were later acknowledged as completing the questionnaire due October 26, 2007. A shortlist of five cities was announced on November 19.

Although it was planned to have an evaluation committee visit the shortlisted cities in December, eventually each city presented a video conference on December 13. As the IOC predicted, they further eliminated some of the cities before the final stage.

The IOC has stressed that the main goal of these games is not competition, but education based on Olympic values. The host city, therefore, should not have to build new venues for the occasion, but rather use existing infrastructure for the games. Still, the games would include an Olympic village and protocols which would prepare young athletes for future Olympic competition.

The risks of quickly preparing for the first edition of the event was a major factor in selection of the final candidates. There will only be two-and-a-half years to organize the Games, but Games with longer lead times may allow some of the non-selected cities to bid for future Games.

An evaluation committee viewed a video conference presentation from each city in December 2007.  In January, the short list was reduced from five to two, Moscow and Singapore.

When the result of the final postal tally was revealed, Singapore won the right to host the Games over Moscow in a tally of 53-44.

Overview of host bid

Evaluation of applicant cities

Applicant cities comparison

IOC evaluation report
 Moscow — scored 7.5 to 8.5
 Singapore — scored 7.4 to 7.9 (bid details)
 Athens — scored 6.2 to 7.2 (bid details)
 Bangkok — scored 5.5 to 6.7
 Turin — scored 5.7 to 6.3
 Kuala Lumpur — scored 4.5 to 5.9
 Debrecen — scored 4.1 to 5.3
 Poznań — scored 4.1 to 5.2
 Guatemala City — scored 2.8 to 3.9

Athens (Greece), Bangkok (Thailand), and Turin (Italy) were three bid cities which made it to the short list, but were later eliminated in January 2008.  Although Athens' bid had sentiment and state of the art venues from its recent hosting of the 2004 Summer Olympics, its bid was ultimately eliminated for having a very high budget (US$273 million) and having events too far from the central sites. Bangkok was praised for its accommodations and facilities, but like Athens, the venues were too spread out and the nation was also experiencing some political instability. Its budget was also considered inadequate. Turin's   plan was somewhat impressive, but a proposed $304 million Olympic Village would not be constructed in time, effectively ending the bid.

Evaluation breakdown
Each cell of the table provides a minimum and a maximum figure obtained by the applicant city on the specific criteria. The graphs are rounded off to the nearest whole number.

Out of the race

Eliminated in final vote

Eliminated from Shortlist

Non-selected applicant cities

Non-finalised applicant cities
  Algiers, Algeria - Algiers did not complete the questionnaire due on October 26, thereby dropping out of the race.
  Belgrade, Serbia - On September 19, during an IOC workshop in Lausanne, the Serbian Olympic Committee announced that Belgrade was withdrawing its bid, opting instead to bid for the 2014 Youth Olympics.
  Guadalajara, Mexico -  showed initial interest.
  Hamburg, Germany -  showed initial interest.
  Lisbon, Portugal -  showed initial interest.

References

External links

Host city
Singapore 2010 Official site

Out of the race cities
Athens 2010 Official site
Bangkok 2010 Official site
Debrecen 2010 Official site
Moscow 2010 Official site

IOC reports
 IOC Panel of Experts Report (November 8, 2007)
 IOC Evaluation of five Shortlisted Cities

 
Bids
2010